Mary Frances “Fannie” McCray (1837–1898). In her biography written by her husband and son she is portrayed as a multifaceted Christian woman. Her life serves as an example of the power and the influence of religion during the time of enslavement and after. At the death of her owner, Polly Adams the will stipulated that she was to be granted freedom and the funds to purchase land in Ohio. As was common at the time, the will was contested, but Polly Adams' relatives were not able to overturn it. In Ohio she eventually marries, Mack McCray, a Union army veteran and a devout Christian. Her many accomplishments include: founder of a Free Methodist church in Dakota Territory; founder First Holiness church of Lima, Ohio; the first black female preacher of the Methodist Church in the Dakota Territory; leader of the African Methodist Episcopal Church in Lima, Ohio.

Notes
Summary of this biography available at:
Butler, Erin Bartels. Summary. Life of Mary F. McCray: Born and Raised a Slave in the State of Kentucky http://docsouth.unc.edu/neh/mccray/summary.html

References

S. J. McCray, Life of Mary F. McCray: Born and Raised a Slave in the State of Kentucky. Lima, Ohio: [s.n.], 1898.
http://docsouth.unc.edu/neh/mccray/menu.html

Terhune, Carol Parker. “McCray, Mary F.” African American National Biography. Edited by Ed. Henry Louis Gates Jr., Evelyn Brooks Higginbotham. Oxford African American Studies Center.

Further reading
Grendler, Marcella; Andrew Leiter, and Jill Sexton. Guide to Religious Content in Slave Narratives. http://docsouth.unc.edu/neh/religiouscontent.html
Maffly-Kipp, L.F. The Church in the Southern Black Community (2001)
http://docsouth.unc.edu/neh/mccray/summary.html

1837 births
1898 deaths